Soil ecology is the study of the interactions among soil organisms, and between biotic and abiotic aspects of the soil environment. It is particularly concerned with the cycling of nutrients, formation and stabilization of the pore structure, the spread and vitality of pathogens, and the biodiversity of this rich biological community.

Overview 
Soil is made up of a multitude of physical, chemical, and biological entities, with many interactions occurring among them.  Soil is a variable mixture of broken and weathered minerals and decaying organic matter.  Together with the proper amounts of air and water, it supplies, in part, sustenance for plants as well as mechanical support.

The diversity and abundance of soil life exceeds that of any other ecosystem.  Plant establishment, competitiveness, and growth is governed largely by the ecology below-ground, so understanding this system is an essential component of plant sciences and terrestrial ecology.

Features of the ecosystem
Moisture is a major limiting factor on land. Terrestrial organisms are constantly confronted with the problem of dehydration. Transpiration or evaporation of water from plant surfaces is an energy dissipating process unique to the terrestrial environment.
Temperature variations and extremes are more pronounced in the air than in the water medium.
On the other hand, the rapid circulation of air throughout the globe results in a ready mixing and remarkably constant content of oxygen and carbon dioxide.
Although soil offers solid support, air does not. Strong skeletons have been evolved in both land plants and animals and also special means of locomotion have been evolved in the latter.
Land, unlike the ocean, is not continuous; there are important geographical barriers to free movement.
The nature of the substrate, although important in water is especially vital in terrestrial environment. Soil, not air, is the source of highly variable nutrients; it is a highly developed ecological subsystem.

Soil fauna
Soil fauna is crucial to soil formation, litter decomposition, nutrient cycling, biotic regulation, and for promoting plant growth. Yet soil organisms remain underrepresented in studies on soil processes and in existing modeling exercises. This is a consequence of assuming that much below ground diversity is ecologically redundant and that soil food webs exhibit a higher degree of omnivory. However, evidence is accumulating on the strong influence of abiotic filters, such as temperature, moisture and soil pH, as well as soil habitat characteristics in controlling their spatial and temporal patterns.

Soils are complex systems and their complexity resides in their heterogeneous nature: a mixture of air, water, minerals, organic compounds, and living organisms. The spatial variation, both horizontal and vertical, of all these constituents is related to soil forming agents varying from micro to macro scales. Consequently, the horizontal patchy distribution of soil properties (soil temperature, moisture, pH, litter/nutrient availability, etc.) also drives the patchiness of the soil organisms across the landscape, and has been one of the main arguments for explaining the great diversity observed in soil communities. Because soils also show vertical stratification of their elemental constituents along the soil profile as result of microclimate, soil texture, and resource quantity and quality differing between soil horizons, soil communities also change in abundance and structure with soil depth.

The majority of these organisms are aerobic, so the amount of porous space, pore-size distribution, surface area, and oxygen levels are crucial to their life cycles and activities. The smallest creatures (microbes) use the micropores filled with air to grow, whereas other bigger animals require bigger spaces, macropores, or the water film surrounding the soil particles to move in search for food. Therefore, soil textural properties together with the depth of the water table are also important factors regulating their diversity, population sizes, and their vertical stratification. Ultimately, the structure of the soil communities strongly depends not only on the natural soil forming factors but also on human activities (agriculture, forestry, urbanization) and determines the shape of landscapes in terms of healthy or contaminated, pristine or degraded soils.

Macrofauna

Since all these drivers of biodiversity changes also operate above ground, it is expected that there must be some concordance of mechanisms regulating the spatial patterns and structure of both above and below ground communities. In support of this, a small-scale field study revealed that the relationships between environmental heterogeneity and species richness might be a general property of ecological communities. In contrast, the molecular examination of 17,516 environmental 18S rRNA gene sequences representing 20 phyla of soil animals covering a range of biomes and latitudes around the world indicated otherwise, and the main conclusion from this study was that below-ground animal diversity may be inversely related to above-ground biodiversity.

The lack of distinct latitudinal gradients in soil biodiversity contrasts with those clear global patterns observed for plants above ground and has led to the assumption that they are indeed controlled by different factors. For example, in 2007 Lozupone and Knight found salinity was the major environmental determinant of bacterial diversity composition across the globe, rather than extremes of temperature, pH, or other physical and chemical factors. In another global scale study in 2014, Tedersoo et al. concluded fungal richness is causally unrelated to plant diversity and is better explained by climatic factors, followed by edaphic and spatial patterns. Global patterns of the distribution of macroscopic organisms are far poorer documented. However, the little evidence available appears to indicate that, at large scales, soil metazoans respond to altitudinal, latitudinal or area gradients in the same way as those described for above-ground organisms. In contrast, at local scales, the high diversity of microhabitats commonly found in soils provides the required niche portioning to create “hot spots” of diversity in just a gram of soil.

Not only spatial patterns of soil biodiversity are difficult to explain, but also its potential linkages to many soil processes and the overall ecosystem functioning remains under debate. For example, while some studies have found that reductions in the abundance and presence of soil organisms results in the decline of multiple ecosystem functions, others concluded that above-ground plant diversity alone is a better predictor of ecosystem multi-functionality than soil biodiversity. Soil organisms exhibit a wide array of feeding preferences, life-cycles and survival strategies and they interact within complex food webs. Consequently, species richness per se has very little influence on soil processes and functional dissimilarity can have stronger impacts on ecosystem functioning. Therefore, besides the difficulties in linking above and below ground diversities at different spatial scales, gaining a better understanding of the biotic effects on ecosystem processes might require incorporating a great number of components together with several multi-trophic levels as well as the much less considered non-trophic interactions such as phoresy, passive consumption.) In addition, if soil systems are indeed self-organized, and soil organisms concentrate their activities within a selected set of discrete scales with some form of overall coordination, there is no need for looking for external factors controlling the assemblages of soil constituents. Instead we might just need to recognize the unexpected and that the linkages between above and below ground diversity and soil processes are difficult to predict.

Microfauna

Recent advances are emerging from studying sub-organism level responses using environmental DNA and various omics approaches, such as metagenomics, metatranscriptomics, proteomics and proteogenomics, are rapidly advancing, at least for the microbial world. Metaphenomics has been proposed recently as a better way to encompass the omics and the environmental constraints.

Soil food web 

An incredible diversity of organisms make up the soil food web. They range in size from the tiniest one-celled bacteria, algae, fungi, and protozoa, to the more complex nematodes and micro-arthropods, to the visible earthworms, insects, small vertebrates, and plants.  As these organisms eat, grow, and move through the soil, they make it possible to have clean water, clean air, healthy plants, and moderated water flow.

There are many ways that the soil food web is an integral part of landscape processes. Soil organisms decompose organic compounds, including manure, plant residues, and pesticides, preventing them from entering water and becoming pollutants.  They sequester nitrogen and other nutrients that might otherwise enter groundwater, and they fix nitrogen from the atmosphere, making it available to plants.  Many organisms enhance soil aggregation and porosity, thus increasing infiltration and reducing surface runoff.  Soil organisms prey on crop pests and are food for above-ground animals.

Research 
Research  interests span many aspects of soil ecology and microbiology, Fundamentally, researchers are interested in understanding the interplay among microorganisms, fauna, and plants, the biogeochemical processes they carry out, and the physical environment in which their activities take place, and  applying this knowledge to address environmental problems.

Example research projects are to examine the biogeochemistry and microbial ecology of septic drain field soils used to treat domestic wastewater, the role of anecic earthworms in controlling the movement of water and nitrogen cycle in agricultural soils, and the assessment of soil quality in turf production.

Of  particular interest  is to understand the roles and functions of arbuscular mycorrhizal fungi in natural ecosystems.  The effect of anthropic soil conditions on arbuscular mycorrhizal fungi, and the production of glomalin by arbuscular mycorrhizal fungi are both of particular interest due to their roles  in sequestering atmospheric carbon dioxide.

References

Bibliography 

 
 
 Killham, 1994, Soil Ecology,  Cambridge University Press
 Metting, 1993,Soil Microbial Ecology,  Marcel Dekker

External links 
 
 
 
 Yahoo!  Soil  Ecology Directory. Url last accessed 2006-04-18

Ecology, soil
Subfields of ecology